Hour of the Wolf is the eighth studio album by Canadian-American rock band Steppenwolf. The album was released in September 1975, by Epic Records. Andy Chapin replaced long time keyboardist Goldy McJohn on this album.

Reception

AllMusic gave the album a negative retrospective review, saying the songs are all competent but adhere too closely to Steppenwolf formulas that had already been played out.

Hour Of The Wolf, was a good album but it didn't have that signature hit single their previous albums had. "Caroline..," a Mars Bonfire penned song was released as a single but failed to chart. Another Mars Bonfire song that was an outtake, "Killer Riff," was said to have been a better choice for a single. But it didn't make it onto the album.

Track listing

Personnel

Steppenwolf
 John Kay – guitar, vocals
 Jerry Edmonton  drums, art direction,
 George Biondo – bass guitar, vocals
 Bobby Cochran – guitar
 Andy Chapin – keyboards

Additional musicians
 Tom Scott – horns, (tracks 1, 5)

Technical
 Steppenwolf – producers
 Ed Bannon – engineer
 Roy Halee – mixing
 Lorrie Sullivan – design, photography

Charts
Album - Billboard (United States)

References

1975 albums
Steppenwolf (band) albums
Epic Records albums